Steve Weslak (born May 13, 1957) is a Canadian film editor.

His many editing credits include The Last Chase (1981), The Care Bears Movie (1985), Deadly Currents (1991) , Helen's War (2004) and The Climb (2007).

Steve is a member of the Canadian Cinema Editors honours society.

External links 
 

1957 births
Living people
Canadian film editors